Pseudomarrubium is a genus of flowering plant in the family Lamiaceae, first described in 1940. It contains only one known species, Pseudomarrubium eremostachydioides, endemic to the Karatau Mountains of Kazakhstan.

References

Lamiaceae
Endemic flora of Kazakhstan
Monotypic Lamiaceae genera